Spore was a noise rock band from Boston, Massachusetts formed in the wake of the early 1990s grunge movement. Spore were signed in 1993 on the Taang! Records label, the same label which initially signed The Lemonheads, the Mighty Mighty Bosstones and Mission of Burma, with whom the band released a 7 inch EP.

Lead singer Mona Elliot's voice has been described as channelling "anger and determination with a style heavily influenced by early Throwing Muses-era Kristin Hersh." The Spore song Fun, from the group's third album was included in the Natural Born Killers film, though it was not released on the official film soundtrack CD. The band was also known for sporting an image of André the Giant on their disc covers, with the image being similar to Shepard Fairey's well known pop art interpretation, Andre the Giant Has a Posse.

Elliot went on to form another well-regarded Boston-based band, Victory at Sea, in 1996. Ayal Naor started up the avant-garde band 27 with members of the Boston band Dirt Merchants, while also contributing on fellow Boston band Isis' critically acclaimed album Oceanic as well as touring with the band.

Band members
 Mona Elliott (vocals, guitar, bass)
 Ayal Naor (vocals, bass, guitar)
 Marc Orleans (guitars, vocals)
 Christian Negrette (drums, vocals)

Discography

LPs
 Spore (1993 - Taang! Records — Recorded in June and September 1992 and March 1993 - Number One / Lee / Fun / Feedback / She Makes Me Feel Violent / Splinter / Bleeding Gums / Fear God)
 Giant (1994 - Taang! Records — Recorded at Fort Apache, Cambridge, Massachusetts in September, 1993 - Paradise / Power Behind / Red To Green / Sick / Crazy Summer / Untitled / Age / Gunfire / Samantha / Black Nail / Flesh Eater)

Singles
 Number One/Splinter (1992 - Cinder Block Records)
 Fear God/I Want You (She's So Heavy) (1993 - Taang! Records)
 Fear God (1993 - Taang! Records)
 Fear God / She's So Heavy / Sick / Bleeding Gums
 Forcefeed / Power Behind (1993 split 7'' with Slughog)
 Active In The Yard  (1993 - split 7'' with Mission Of Burma)
 Phuko & Flan Is Ta (1994 - split EP with Queer - Chunk Records)

See also
 Noise Rock
 27 (band)
 Victory at Sea (band)

External links
Spore... retrospective blog February 9, 2007
TAANG! Records website
[ Allmusic entry]
The Almost Complete List of Natural Born Killers music
Video of Song Bleeding Gums
Mona Elliott write up
Portland Mercury Music review October 11, 2001
Isis - 10 Year Anniversary Show Review


References

Musical groups from Boston
American noise rock music groups